The 6th arrondissement of Marseille is one of the 16 arrondissements of Marseille. It is governed locally together with the 8th arrondissement, with which it forms the 4th sector of Marseille.

Principal monuments
Basilique Notre-Dame de la Garde
Église Saint-Joseph 
 
 Place Castellane

Demographics

By neighbourhood

References

External links
 Official website
 Dossier complet, INSEE

6th arrondissement of Marseille
06